Jalpan may refer to one of two municipalities in Mexico:
Jalpan, Puebla
Jalpan de Serra, Querétaro